Wilkatana Station is a sheep and cattle station in the Australian state of South Australia located north of the regional city of Port Augusta and south of Lake Torrens.

The station consists of an arid plain between the Flinders Ranges and Lake Torrens, and exhibits some salt flats. 

The traditional owners of the area are the Barngarla people.

In April 2013, the land occupying the appropriate western half of the Wilkatana Station was gazetted by the Government of South Australia as a locality under the name Wilkatana Station.

See also
List of ranches and stations

References

Far North (South Australia)
Stations (Australian agriculture)
Pastoral leases in South Australia